"Piano" is a song written by Manny Benito and Jorge Luis Piloto and performed by Cuban musician Paquito Hechavarría for his studio album of the same name. The song features Cuban singer Rey Ruiz as the lead vocalist while an instrumental version of the song was included the album as well. The Cashbox critic Héctor Reséndez felt that the song "has all the right ingredients for success in the jazz and tropical music markets". However, Fernando Gonzalez of the Miami Herald called it a "generic salsa" and regarded Hechavarría's performance as "exact, if constrained, playing throughout. The track was recognized as one of the best-performing songs of the year at the 1996 ASCAP Latin Awards.

Charts

Year-end charts

See also
List of Billboard Tropical Airplay number ones of 1994 and 1995

References

Songs about pianos
1994 singles
1994 songs
Rey Ruiz songs
Spanish-language songs